Jacques Bens (25 March 1931 – 26 July 2001) was a French writer and poet.

Biography 

Born of teacher-parents  at Cadolive, Jacques Bens spent his childhood and his youth in Marseilles, where his studies in zoology were interrupted in 1951 for health reasons. He became the son-in-law of Célestin Freinet, collaborated with the Freinet Modern School Movement and worked at the Coopérative de l'enseignement secaire (CEL).

Jacques Bens worked from 1960 to 1963 under the direction of Raymond Queneau at the  Encyclopédie de la Pléiade. Dataire of the College of 'Pataphysics; Bens was a co-founder member of the Oulipo, participated on 24 November 1960 with Claude Berge,  François Le Lionnais, Jean Lescure, Raymond Queneau and Jean Queval at the first meeting of which he was definitively appointed provisional secretary.

In 1963, Jacques Bens returned to the Alpes-Maritimes, where he was responsible for various publishing works and then relations with the press of the Théâtre de Nice (1972–1975).

Between 1980 and 1991, he was general secretary of the Société des gens de lettres and held the crossword heading of L'Express and Lire.

Works 
Jacques Bens himself collected his books under different sections: « prose rimée » (poetry), « prose romanesque » (novels), « prose méditative » (reflexions), « prose didactique » (essays), « prose dramatique » (theatre and radio) and « prose secrétariale » (séessuibs of the Oulipo). He is also the author of the introduction of the collection of the pedagogical works of his famous father-in-law, Célestin Freinet. (Œuvres pédagogiques de Célestin Freinet, Éditions du Seuil, 1994.)

« Prose rimée » (poems)
1958: Chanson vécue, collection Métamorphoses, Éditions Gallimard, 104 p. (Prix Fénéon)
1962: 41 sonnets irrationnels, Gallimard
1966: Le Retour au pays, Gallimard
1967: Métagrammes
1968: Petites prophéties populaires
1978: Onzains incertains, texte autographié, Paris, 25 p.
2004: 'De l'Oulipo et de la Chandelle verte, complete poetry, preface by Jacques Roubaud, edition by François Caradec, Gallimard,  Prose romanesque (novels and short stories)
1958: Valentin, Gallimard
1959: La Plume et l'ange, Gallimard
1962: Sept jours de liberté, short stories, Gallimard
1962: La Trinité, Gallimard
1969: Adieu Sidonie, Gallimard
1976: Rouge grenade, Éditions Grasset, 
1979: Rendez-vous chez François, Bibliothèque oulipienne
1979: Le Pain perdu, with twenty etchings of Proscynska, by the artist 
1983: Cinq châteaux de cartes, series " Arc-en-Poche", Nathan, (Prix Jean Macé)
1986: Gaspard de Besse, Ramsay, (Goncourt du Récit historique)
1988: Nouvelles des enchanteurs, Ramsay,  
1990: Nouvelles désenchantées, Seghers,, 224 p. (Goncourt de la Nouvelle) 
1994: Les Dames d'onze heures, Éditions Julliard, 168 p. 
1997:La Belle Étoile, Atelier du Gué
1998:Lente sortie de l'ombre, Stock

« Prose méditative » (réflexions)
1975: Pense-bête1989: La Cinquantaine à Saint-Quentin, Seghers
1997: Quarante-neuf questions pour essayer de comprendre le monde, Les Guère Épais, Plurielle
2000: 12 maximes fin de siècle, Atelier-Musée Livre & Typographie

« Prose didactique » (essays)
1962: Queneau, Bibliothèque idéale, Gallimard
1967: Guide des jeux d'esprit, Albin Michel
1976: Boris Vian, Présence littéraire, Bordas
1979: La Semence d'Horus (Contes de l'Égypte des Pharaons), Garnier Frères,  
1992: Ginkgo biloba, l'arbre aux quarante écus, SEMAPA
1994: Marcel Pagnol, Écrivains de toujours, Éditions du Seuil

« Prose dramatique » (theatre and radio)
1973: Les Frelons, after Aristophanes, Comédy by Saint-Étienne
1986: Les Vaudois, France Culture
1987: Geoffroy Tête noire à Ventadour, Festival de la Luzège
1989: Une si jolie maison dans le soleil levant, Radio France
1989: La Guerre aux étangs, Festival de la Luzège

« Prose secrétariale » (sessions of the Oulipo).
1980: Oulipo, 1960-1963, Christian Bourgois ; L'Oulipo, genesis of the Oulipo, 1960-1963, revised and expanded edition, presented by Jacques Duchateau, 2005 

Trivia
1998: La cuisine en jeux, 
1999: Mots croisés I and II, Zulma

Posthumous publicationsJacques Bens, textes inédits [Raymond Queneau et la littérature potentielle, Pour une potentialité nouvelle], in Cahiers Raymond Queneau, Association des amis de Valentin Brû, éditions Calliopées, Clamart, 2011, (p. 49-64)

 Bibliography 
Camille Bloomfield, Un Oulipo potentiel : quand Queneau corrige Bens, dans Ouvroirs, Revue d'études sur Raymond Queneau, (p. 56-57), Association des amis de Valentin Brû, December 2009, (pp. 43–56)

 See also 
Oulipo
La Bibliothèque oulipienne

 External links 
 Jacques Bens  on Babelio
 Jacques Bens on Oulipo
 Jacques Bens on Encyclopædia Universalis
 Jacques Bens on Éditions Zulma
 Jacques Bens on Libération'' (1 August 2001)
 Jacques Bens on Cairn.info
 Bibliography on Fatrazie
  Jacques Bens : Pagnol on YouTube

20th-century French male writers
Pataphysicians
20th-century French poets
Prix Fénéon winners
Prix Goncourt de la nouvelle recipients
Oulipo members
People from Bouches-du-Rhône
Crossword compilers
1931 births
2001 deaths